In enzymology, an acid—CoA ligase (GDP-forming) is an enzyme that catalyzes the chemical reaction

GTP + an acid + CoA  GDP + phosphate + acyl-CoA

The 3 substrates of this enzyme are GTP, acid, and CoA, whereas its 3 products are GDP, phosphate, and acyl-CoA.

This enzyme belongs to the family of ligases, specifically those forming carbon-sulfur bonds as acid-thiol ligases.  The systematic name of this enzyme class is acid:CoA ligase (GDP-forming). Other names in common use include acyl-CoA synthetase (GDP-forming), and acyl coenzyme A synthetase (guanosine diphosphate forming).

References 

 

EC 6.2.1
Enzymes of unknown structure